The 2004 Pittsburgh Panthers football team represented the University of Pittsburgh in the 2004 NCAA Division I-A football season. Pittsburgh won a share of The Big East Conference championship and were awarded with a BCS berth to the 2005 Fiesta Bowl.

Schedule

Personnel

Team players drafted into the NFL

References

Pittsburgh
Pittsburgh Panthers football seasons
Big East Conference football champion seasons
Pittsburgh Panthers football